Khagani Alley (or Khagani Street) is a road from Rasul Rza alley to Kovkab Khanim Safaraliyeva alley. There are many historical monuments of the 16th to 20th centuries on the street, as well as a statue and three parks.

History 
Construction of this alley began in the early 1880s. The alley was named Molokanskaya after the Molokans who first came here and settled there. Khagani Garden, where the street begins, was once called Molokan Garden. The alley starts from Molokan Park or Marinsky Park and extends to the east of the area, which was an industrial zone of the city at that time. Capital-style buildings were built on the alley in the XIX-XX centuries. Since the classical principles were not included in the design structure of the buildings in the early days, the houses No. 1,3,5 built on the alley were built in a free style of architecture. Later, with the arrival of architects trained in architecture, more interesting compositions appeared in the construction of facades and interiors. Architects Anton Kandinov and Yuzef Ploshko made a great contribution to the architecture of the alley. The building of the Union of Artists of Azerbaijan, the building of the Union of Composers of Azerbaijan, the building of the Azerbaijan State Academic Russian Drama Theater named after Samad Vurgun, the four-storey entrance house of Musa Nagiyev, the building of the Azerbaijan National Library and other important historical buildings are located on the alley. After the April occupation, the alley was renamed January 9, 1929.

Since 1946, the street has been named Khagani Alley in honor of the prominent representative of classical Azerbaijani literature, poet-philosopher Khagani Shirvani.

Historical and architectural monuments

Parks and gardens

Khagani Garden  

Khagani Garden one of the oldest parks in Baku with an area of 0.8 hectares. It is located in Sabail district. The park is named after the poet Khagani Shirvani, who lived in Shamakhi in the Middle Ages. The park is bounded on the south by Uzeyir Hajibeyov Street, on the north by Khagani Street, on the east by Gogol Street, and on the west by Rasul Riza Street. The basis of the architectural-landscape composition of the garden consists of a curved pool with a group of sculptures "Three beauties" consisting of statues of three girls. The group of sculptures is mounted on large pieces of ordinary stone..

Sahil Garden 

Located in the central part of Baku, at the intersection of Khagani Street, Bulbul Avenue, Uzeyir Hajibeyli and Rashid Behbudov Streets, in front of the National Library of Azerbaijan named after Mirza Fatali Akhundzade, the garden is surrounded by historical buildings. The first name of the garden was Birjevaya Square. After the establishment of the Azerbaijan Democratic Republic, it was renamed as Azadliq Square. After the April occupation, after 26 Baku commissars were buried here, a monument was erected in their memory and the garden was renamed. After independence, the monument of the commissars was removed from the park and renamed Sahil garden.

Fikret Amirov Park  
In 2011, a statue of Azerbaijani composer, People's Artist of the USSR, laureate of the USSR State Prize, Hero of Socialist Labor, laureate of the State Prize of the Azerbaijan SSR Fikret Amirov was put on Khagani Street in Baku and a new park was built. The sculptor of the statue is Namig Dadashov.

References

Streets in Baku